The 2022 NCAA Division I men's ice hockey tournament was the national championship tournament for men's college ice hockey in the United States scheduled for on April 7–9, 2022. The tournament involved 16 teams in single-elimination play to determine the national champion at the Division I level of the National Collegiate Athletic Association (NCAA), the highest level of competition in college hockey. The tournament's Frozen Four—the semifinals and finals—were hosted by Hockey East at the TD Garden in Boston, Massachusetts.

Tournament procedure

The tournament is composed of four groups of four teams in regional brackets.  The four regionals are officially named after their geographic areas.  The following are the sites for the 2022 regionals:

March 24 & 26, 2022
East Regional, MVP Arena – Albany, New York (Hosts: Union)
West Regional, Budweiser Events Center – Loveland, Colorado (Host: Denver)
March 25 & 27, 2022
Midwest Regional, PPL Center – Allentown, Pennsylvania (Host: Penn State)
Northeast Regional, DCU Center – Worcester, Massachusetts (Host: Holy Cross)

The winner of each regional will advance to the Frozen Four:
April 7–9
TD Garden – Boston, Massachusetts (Host: Hockey East)

Qualifying teams

The at-large bids and seeding for each team in the tournament were announced on March 20, 2022.

The NCHC received five bids, the Big Ten and Hockey East each received three, the CCHA and ECAC both received two, and one team from Atlantic Hockey received a berth.

Number in parentheses denotes overall seed in the tournament.

Tournament bracket 

* denotes overtime period

Results
Note: All game times are local.

Midwest Region – Allentown, Pennsylvania

Regional semifinals

Regional Final

East Region – Albany, New York

Regional semifinals

Regional Final

Northeast Region – Worcester, Massachusetts

Regional semifinals

Regional Final

West Region – Loveland, Colorado

Regional semifinals

Regional Final

Frozen Four – Boston, Massachusetts

National semifinals

National Championship

All-Tournament team
G: Magnus Chrona (Denver)
D: Michael Benning* (Denver)
D: Jack McNeely (Minnesota State)
F: Carter Savoie (Denver)
F: Ryan Barrow (Denver)
F: Sam Morton (Minnesota State)
* Most Outstanding Player(s)

Record by conference

Media

Television
ESPN has US television rights to all games during the tournament for the seventeenth consecutive year. ESPN will air every game, beginning with the regionals, on ESPN2, ESPNews, or ESPNU. Additionally all matches will be streamed online via the ESPN app.

Broadcast assignments
Regionals
East Regional: Ben Holden and Dave Starman – Albany, New York
West Regional: Dan Kelly and Paul Caponigri – Loveland, Colorado
Midwest Regional: Clay Matvick and Sean Ritchlin – Allentown, Pennsylvania
Northeast Regional: John Buccigross, Barry Melrose, and Colby Cohen – Worcester, Massachusetts 

Frozen Four
 John Buccigross, Barry Melrose, and Colby Cohen – Boston, Massachusetts

Radio
Westwood One has exclusive radio rights to the Frozen Four and will broadcast both the semifinals and the championship.
 Brian Tripp, Dave Starman, and Shireen Saski

References

 

 
NCAA Division I men's ice hockey tournament
NCAA Division I men's ice hockey tournament
NCAA Division I men's ice hockey tournament
NCAA Division I men's ice hockey tournament
NCAA Division I men's ice hockey tournament
NCAA Division I men's ice hockey tournament
NCAA Division I men's ice hockey tournament
NCAA Division I men's ice hockey tournament
College sports tournaments in Colorado
College sports tournaments in Massachusetts
College sports tournaments in New York (state)
College sports tournaments in Pennsylvania
Ice hockey competitions in Boston
Ice hockey competitions in Denver
Ice hockey competitions in Worcester, Massachusetts
Ice hockey competitions in Albany, New York
Sports in Allentown, Pennsylvania
Loveland, Colorado